Teddy Kotick (born Theodore John Kotick; June 4, 1928 – April 17, 1986) was an American jazz bassist, who appeared as a sideman with many of the leading figures of the 1940s and 1950s, including Charlie Parker, Buddy Rich, Artie Shaw, Horace Silver, Phil Woods and Bill Evans.

He was born in Haverhill, Massachusetts, United States. Kotick never recorded as a leader. He died of a brain tumor in 1986, aged 57.

Discography
With Teddy Charles
 Teddy Charles Featuring Bobby Brookmeyer (Prestige, 1954)
 The Teddy Charles Tentet (Atlantic, 1956)
 Russia Goes Jazz (United Artists, 1964)

With Bill Evans
 New Jazz Conceptions (Riverside, 1957)
 The Secret Sessions (Recorded At The Village Vanguard 1966-1975) (Milestone, 1996) – gig in 1966 only

With Tony Fruscella
 Debut (Spotlite, 1981)
 Fru'n Brew (Spotlite, 1981)
 The 1954 Unissued Atlantic Session (Fresh Sound, 2011)

With Charlie Parker
 Charlie Parker Plays Cole Porter (Verve, 1957)
 Fiesta (Verve, 1957)
 Now's the Time (Verve, 1957)
 Swedish Schnapps (Verve, 1958)
 The Happy Bird (Charlie Parker, 1961)
 Bird with Strings (Columbia, 1977)

With Jimmy Raney
 Jimmy Raney featuring Bob Brookmeyer (ABC-Paramount, 1956)
 The Fourmost Guitars (ABC-Paramount, 1957)
 A (Prestige, 1958)

With Horace Silver
 The Stylings of Silver (Blue Note, 1957)
 Further Explorations (Blue Note, 1958)

With George Wallington
 Jazz for the Carriage Trade (Prestige, 1956)
 Knight Music (Atlantic, 1956)
 The New York Scene (New Jazz, 1957)
 The Prestidigitator (EastWest, 1958)

With Phil Woods
 Encores (Prestige, 1955)
 Woodlore (Prestige, 1956)
 The Young Bloods (Prestige, 1956)
 Phil and Quill with Prestige (Prestige, 1957)
 Bird Feathers (Prestige, 1957)
 Sugan (Status, 1965)

With others
 Buddy Arnold, Wailing (ABC-Paramount, 1956)
 Bob Brookmeyer, The Dual Role of Bob Brookmeyer (Prestige, 1955)
 Kenny Burrell, Earthy (Prestige, 1957)
 Donald Byrd, House of Byrd (Prestige, 1976)
 John Carisi, The New Jazz Sound of Show Boat (Columbia, 1960)
 Al Cohn, Al and Zoot (Coral, 1957)
 Al Cohn, The Al Cohn Quintet Featuring Bobby Brookmeyer (Coral, 1957)
 Eddie Costa, Eddie Costa Quintet (Mode, 1957)
 Bill DeArango, De Arango (EmArcy, 1954)
 Allen Eager, Renaissance (Uptown, 1981)
 Jon Eardley, The Jon Eardley Seven (Prestige, 1956)
 Stan Getz, Interpretations by the Stan Getz Quintet (Norgran, 1954)
 Stan Getz, The Complete Roost Recordings (Blue Note, 1997)
 Urbie Green, The Message (RCA 1986)
 Al Haig, Al Haig Quartet (Period, 1954)
 Roy Haynes, A Life in Time (Dreyfus, 2007)
 Billie Holiday, Gallant Lady (Family, 1973)
 Duke Jordan & Hall Overton, Jazz Laboratory Series (Arista, 1981)
 Jimmy Knepper, A Swinging Introduction to Jimmy Knepper (Bethlehem, 1957)
 Art Mardigan The Jazz School (Wing 1955) – four tracks, album shared with Clark Terry, Paul Gonsalves, Joe Gordon 
 Teo Macero, What's New? (Columbia, 1956)
 Helen Merrill, The Artistry of Helen Merrill (Mainstream, 1965)
 J. R. Monterose, Welcome Back J.R.! (Progressive, 1979)
 J. R. Monterose, Live in Albany (Uptown, 1980)
 Herbie Nichols, Herbie Nichols Trio (Blue Note, 1956)
 Herbie Nichols, The Complete Blue Note Recordings (Blue Note, 1997)
 Hod O'Brien, Bits and Pieces (Uptown, 1981)
 Hall Overton, Jazz Laboratory Series Vol. 2 (Signal, 1955)
 George Russell, The Jazz Workshop (RCA Victor, 1957)
 Bobby Scott, Bobby Scott Sings the Best of Lerner and Loewe (LPTime, 2010)
 Tony Scott, Both Sides of Tony Scott (RCA Victor, 1956)
 Martial Solal, At Newport '63 (RCA Victor, 1963)
 Rene Thomas, Guitar Groove (Jazzland, 1960)
 Nick Travis, The Panic Is On (RCA Victor, 1954)

References

External links 
[ AllMusic]

1928 births
1986 deaths
20th-century American male musicians
20th-century double-bassists
American jazz double-bassists
Jazz musicians from Massachusetts
Male double-bassists
American male jazz musicians
Musicians from Haverhill, Massachusetts